The New Zealand Hydrological Society (NZHS) is a non-profit organisation founded in 1961 to further the science of hydrology and its application to the understanding and management of New Zealand's water resources. The society is a constituent body of the Royal Society of New Zealand.

The society publishes the Journal of Hydrology (New Zealand) twice a year, since 1962.

References

External links 

Hydrology organizations
Organizations established in 1961
1961 establishments in New Zealand
Professional associations based in New Zealand